Bremsnes is a former municipality in Møre og Romsdal county, Norway. The  municipality existed from 1897 until its dissolution in 1964. Bremsnes municipality surrounded the Bremsnesfjorden and it included parts of the islands of Averøya, Frei, and Nordlandet.  Bremsnes essentially encircled the town of Kristiansund on the west, south, and east sides.  The administrative centre of Bremsnes was the village of Bremsnes, where Bremsnes Church is located.

History
The municipality of Bremsnes was established on 1 January 1897 when the large municipality of Kvernes was divided into four municipalities: Kvernes, Kornstad, Eide, and Bremsnes. Initially, Bremsnes had a population of 2,917. On 8 July 1903, an uninhabited part of Bremsnes was transferred back to Kvernes. During the 1960s, there were many municipal mergers across Norway due to the work of the Schei Committee. On 1 January 1964, Bremsnes municipality was dissolved. The Bolga and Valen areas on the island of Frei (population: 884) became a part of Frei Municipality.  The Dale area on the island of Nordlandet (population: 963) was incorporated into Kristiansund Municipality.  The rest of Bremsnes (population: 3,153) was merged with Kvernes Municipality and most of Kornstad Municipality to create the new Averøy Municipality.

Government
All municipalities in Norway, including Bremsnes, are responsible for primary education (through 10th grade), outpatient health services, senior citizen services, unemployment and other social services, zoning, economic development, and municipal roads.  The municipality is governed by a municipal council of elected representatives, which in turn elects a mayor.

Municipal council
The municipal council  of Bremsnes was made up of 29 representatives that were elected to four year terms.  The party breakdown of the final municipal council was as follows:

See also
List of former municipalities of Norway

References

Averøy
Former municipalities of Norway
1897 establishments in Norway
1964 disestablishments in Norway